Richard Remo is a South Sudanese politician. He has served as Commissioner of Headquarters of Central Equatoria since 2005.

References

21st-century South Sudanese politicians
Living people
Year of birth missing (living people)
Place of birth missing (living people)
People from Central Equatoria